Al-Sultan Abdullah I Sri Dhanmaru Aadheettha Mahaa Radhun was the Sultan of the Maldives from 1374 to 1376.

He was vizier to the court before forcing his wife Queen Khadijah to abdicate, and succeeding to the throne. In his third year of reign his wife killed him while he was asleep in bed and reclaimed the throne once again.

14th-century sultans of the Maldives
Year of birth unknown
1376 deaths